Elford Albin "Al" Cederberg (March 6, 1918 – April 17, 2006) was a politician from the U.S. state of Michigan.

Biography
Cederberg was born to dairy farmers Albin and Helen (Olson) Cederberg in Bay City, Michigan; his father and maternal grandparents were immigrants from Sweden. He attended public schools and at Bay City Junior College (1935–1937).

He entered the United States Army in April 1941, and was commissioned a second lieutenant in July 1942, became a captain in 1943, and was assigned to the 83rd Infantry Division. He participated in the Normandy invasion, and fought in France and Germany during World War II. He was decorated with five campaign battle stars and the Bronze Star. After the war, he was manager of  Nelson Manufacturing Company  of Bay City 1946–1952, and was mayor of Bay City from 1949 to 1953.

In 1950, Cederberg unsuccessfully challenged incumbent Roy O. Woodruff in the Republican Party primary election for the U.S. House of Representatives in Michigan's 10th congressional district. Woodruff did not seek the nomination in 1952 and Cederberg won the Republican primary. He went on to win the general election to the 83rd Congress and was subsequently re-elected to the twelve succeeding Congresses, serving from January 3, 1953, until his resignation December 31, 1978. Cederberg voted in favor of the Civil Rights Acts of 1957, 1960, 1964, and 1968, as well as the 24th Amendment to the U.S. Constitution and the Voting Rights Act of 1965. He became the ranking minority member of the House Appropriations Committee. He was an unsuccessful candidate for reelection in 1978 to the 96th Congress, losing to Democrat Donald J. Albosta.

Personal life
After the end of his term in Congress, Cederberg lived in Alexandria, Virginia and was a consultant for United Technologies, RCA, and Grumman Aircraft. He moved to Florida in the late 1990s. Cederberg died of heart and kidney ailments in The Villages, Florida at the age of 88 and was interred in Elm Lawn Cemetery of Bay City. He was survived by two children from his first marriage; Tom Cederberg and Marilyn Warner.   His first marriage to Arlene Munro Cederberg (1916–2001) ended in divorce. His second wife, Marguerite Kletchka Cederberg, whom he married in 1958, died in March 2006.

References

External links

 Retrieved on 2008-04-07
 Political Graveyard
 
 
 
 
 
 

1918 births
2006 deaths
Politicians from Bay City, Michigan
American people of Swedish descent
Republican Party members of the United States House of Representatives from Michigan
Mayors of places in Michigan
Businesspeople from Michigan
20th-century American politicians
People from The Villages, Florida
United States Army personnel of World War II
Military personnel from Michigan
United States Army officers
20th-century American businesspeople